Wan'an station may refer to:

 Wan'an station (Beijing Subway), in Beijing, China
 Wan'an station (Chengdu Metro), in Chengdu, Sichuan Province, China